Killulta Church is a medieval church and a National Monument in County Limerick, Ireland.

Location

History

Killulta church is believed to be one of the oldest stone churches in Ireland.

Samuel Lewis incorrectly claimed it was built by the Knights Templar in 1290. However, others date the church to pre-1100, even as early as the 5th century AD. Most scholars date it to the 9th century.

Local historian Mairtín Ó Corrbhuí records that a bronze pin and bronze sword were found near the church.

The name is believed to mean "church of the Ulsterman" or "church of Saint Ultan."

It was also known as Kellallathan (cealla leathan, "broad church").

Church

Killulta measures 5 × 3 metres on the inside, with walls 1 metre thick. It is constructed of large stones and has a plain doorway and triangular-headed east window.

References

Religion in County Limerick
Archaeological sites in County Limerick
National Monuments in County Limerick
Former churches in the Republic of Ireland